The Ferrater Mora Oxford Centre for Animal Ethics is an organisation based in Oxford which promotes animal ethics.

History 
The centre was founded in Oxford in 2006 by Andrew Linzey, a member of the Faculty of Theology at the University of Oxford, though the centre is not affiliated with the university. Other founding fellows were Ara Paul Barsam and Mark H. Bernstein. The centre is named after the Catalan philosopher José Ferrater Mora.

The centre held an International Conference on the Relationship between Animal Abuse and Human Violence at Keble College, Oxford, in 2007.

Mission 
The centre promotes ethical concern for animals through academic study and public debate, and aims to create a global association of academics willing to advance the ethical case for animals. To that end, it publishes an academic journal, the Journal of Animal Ethics, jointly with the University of Illinois. It has also established an animal ethics series with Palgrave MacMillan.

Notable members 
Fellows include Robert Garner, Steven M. Wise and Martin Henig. Honorary fellows include J. M. Coetzee, Joy Carter, Bob Barker and Philip Wollen.

See also
Animal Ethics (organization)
UPF-Centre for Animal Ethics

References

Further reading

External links

2006 establishments in England
Academic organisations based in the United Kingdom
Animal ethics organizations
Organisations based in Oxford
Research institutes established in 2006